Syska Hennessy is a global consulting, engineering and commissioning firm for the built environment. Established in 1928, Syska Hennessy was ranked the 161st-largest U.S. design firm by Engineering-News Record in 2022. The firm has over 500 employees with 20 offices worldwide, including 18 U.S. locations as well as Shanghai, China, and Dubai, UAE.  Consulting-Specifying Engineer magazine placed Syska Hennessy 19th overall in its 2022 MEP Giants list, with gross revenue over $110 million. More than 90% of its revenue is derived from mechanical, electrical, and plumbing engineering services, according to the CSE ranking report, Building Design + Construction magazine ranked Syska Hennessy15th in its 2022 list of top building engineering firms.

History
Syska Hennessy was founded in 1928, by two mechanical engineers, Adolph G. Syska and John F. Hennessy. Originally established in New York City as Syska & Hennessy Engineers, the firm was among the earliest to specialize in the mechanical and electrical systems at the heart of high-rise structures.

1930s
US Post Office Building, Washington, DC
Frick Collection, New York
LaGuardia Airport, New York
1939 World’s Fair, New York

1940s
United Nations Headquarters, New York
Todd Shipyards, New York, New Jersey, Louisiana, Maine

1950s
West Point, New York
US Air Force Academy, Colorado
Columbia University, New York
New York University Medical School, New York
Massachusetts Institute of Technology, Massachusetts

1960s
Lincoln Center, New York
Rockefeller Center, New York
John F. Kennedy Center for the Performing Arts, Washington, DC
National Gallery of Art, Washington, DC
Madison Square Gardens, New York
JFK Airport, New York
Bureau of Printing and Engraving, Washington, DC
New Jersey College of Medicine
Procter & Gamble Headquarters - Cincinnati, Ohio
Mount Sinai Hospital - Annemberg Tower, Manhattan, New York
New York University, New York

1970s
National University of Iran, Tehran
King Saud University, Saudi Arabia
Monterey Bay Aquarium, California
IBM, Bordeaux, France

1980s
Harvard University, Massachusetts
Boston Museum of Fine Arts, Massachusetts
New York City Convention Center, New York
Los Angeles International Airport, California
Disney World, Florida

1990s
Amgen*Bristol-Myers Squibb
Bank of America, Nationwide
Sony Pictures Studios, California
Paramount Pictures, California
Reagan National Airport, Washington, DC

Notable projects
 
Cooper Union Academic Center
U.S. Environmental Protection Agency Region 8 Headquarters
Maricopa County - New High-Rise Court Tower
2000 Avenue of the Stars
Nokia Corporate Headquarters
Red Bull Headquarters
New York Presbyterian, Milstein Heart Hospital
Dulles International Airport Automated People Movers; East Z-Gates Concourse
Chennai International Airport
Haeundae Udong Hyundai I'Park Development
King Saud University
Dubai International Airport

California Academy of Sciences
Indianapolis International Airport, Midfield Terminal
KAPSARC
Busan Lotte World Tower
Lotte Jamsil

References

Engineering companies of the United States
American companies established in 1928